Perhana (پڑھنہ) is a village and union council (an administrative subdivision) of Mansehra District in the Khyber Pakhtunkhwa Province of Pakistan. It is located in the south of the district and lies to the west of the district capital Mansehra.

The main language spoken is  Hindko.
The major castes of Perhinna is Tanoli, Syeds, Awan, Khankhail and Gujjar.

Environment
Most of the area is arid or rain-fed. About 45% of the people are involved in the agricultural sector. Timber is the main source of fuel.

References

Union councils of Mansehra District
Populated places in Mansehra District